Acantholipes trimeni, or Trimen's knob, is a species of moth in the family Erebidae. The species is found in various countries of subtropical Africa.

References

External links
Africanmoths.com Pictures of Acantholipes trimeni
 With images.

trimeni
Moths described in 1874
Moths of Madagascar
Moths of Cape Verde
Moths of Africa